Jeanne Germaine Berthe Agnès Souret (21 January 1902 – 30 September 1928) was a French actress and dancer who was the winner of the inaugural Miss France competition in 1920.

Biography
Jeanne Germaine Berthe Agnès Souret was a French-Basque born in Biarritz on 21 January 1902, the daughter of former ballet dancer Marguerite Souret. Her grandfather was Henri Souret, a customs official in the town of Bidarray. Her formative years were spent at Espelette in Labourd, Northern Basque Country.

La plus belle femme de France
In 1919, the dark brown haired, brown eyed Souret was the winner of a beauty competition to become Miss Midi-Pyrénées. In 1920, she was acclaimed the most beautiful woman in France (La plus belle femme de France) in a contest now regarded as the inaugural Miss France competition. The seventeen-year-old Souret won over 2000 entrants and attracted 115,000 votes. In Le Figaro, she was described as a ‘’dazzling beauty’’. In The New York Times, she was called "the fairest in France".

Career
Souret's success in the competition and the subsequent publicity resulted in her becoming for a few years one of the most celebrated  women in France. Her photograph was extensively circulated in journals and magazines.

Details of her life were commonplace in the gossip columns of the early 20s. She appeared in a dancing role at the famous Parisian music hall the Folies Bergère and at the Opéra de Monte-Carlo. She was in two films directed by Henry Houry: La Maison des pendus and Le Lys du Mont Saint-Michel.

Her fame extended beyond France to the United Kingdom where, in 1922, she appeared in the revue Pins and Needles at the Gaiety Theatre in the West End of London. While in London, she was invited, along with two English actresses Margaret Leahy and Katherine Campbell, by film director Edward José and producer Joseph M. Schenck for an audition to appear in films in Hollywood travelling to the United States at the end of 1922. Although her screen tests do not appear to have led a role, her beauty was noticed. Her book, The Famous Book of Beauty Secrets, was published by the Chicago Mail Order Company in 1922.

Death
Agnès Souret died of peritonitis on 30 September 1928, aged 26, whilst touring Argentina. To ensure that her body could be repatriated to France, Souret's mother Marguerite raised the money by selling many of her goods including her house at Espelette. Agnès Souret was laid to rest at her home Basque Country village in a tomb that features a sculpture by Lucien Danglade.

Filmography
 1920  Le Lys du Mont Saint-Michel 
 1921  La Maison des pendus

Notes

References

1902 births
1928 deaths
French-Basque people
People from Biarritz
French female models
French female dancers
French film actresses
French silent film actresses
20th-century French actresses
Deaths from peritonitis